Arthurette is a Canadian farming community in Victoria County, New Brunswick. It is located on the Tobique River halfway between the villages of Plaster Rock and Perth-Andover. The community is located where the Route 109 and Route 390 change banks of the Tobique River.

History

The community was named after Arthuret in Cumbria, England by Arthur Hamilton-Gordon, 1st Baron Stanmore, who was lieutenant governor of New Brunswick from 1861 to 1866.

There was once a covered bridge, but it was destroyed during the spring freshet on April 22, 1950. A replacement bridge was also swept away during a fall freshet on November 6.

Notable people

Former New Brunswick Premier John B. McNair was raised in Arthurette.

See also
List of communities in New Brunswick

References

Communities in Victoria County, New Brunswick